Takht-e Rud (also Romanized as Takht-e Rūd and Takht Rūd; also known as Tahtarun, Taḩt-e Rūd, Taht Rood, and Taḩt Rūd) is a village in Surmaq Rural District, in the Central District of Abadeh County, Fars Province, Iran. At the 2006 census, its population was 20, comprising six families.

References 

Populated places in Abadeh County